Football, etc. is an American emo band from Houston, Texas.

History
Football, etc. began in 2009 with the release of a four song EP titled First Down. They signed to Count Your Lucky Stars Records in June 2009. Later the same year, Football, etc. released a split with fellow emo band Empire! Empire! (I Was a Lonely Estate). Football, etc. released their first full-length in 2011 titled The Draft on Count Your Lucky Stars and Strictly No Capital Letters. In 2013, Football, etc. released a split with the band Plaids. Also in 2013, Football, etc. released their second full-length album titled Audible, on Count Your Lucky Stars and Strictly No Capital Letters. In 2015, Football, etc. released an EP titled Disappear on Count Your Lucky Stars and Strictly No Capital Letters. In 2017, Football, etc. released their third full-length album, Corner, on  Community Records and Barely Regal Records.

Discography
Studio albums
The Draft (2011)
Audible (2013)
Corner (2017)
EPs
First Down (2009)
Football, etc. (2010)
Disappear (2015)
Splits
Football, etc./Empire Empire (I Was A Lonely Estate) (2009)
Football, etc./Square Business (2012)
Football, etc./Plaids (2013)

References

Musical groups from Houston
Musical groups established in 2009
Count Your Lucky Stars Records artists